The Embassy of Canada to Romania in Bucharest is the diplomatic mission of Canada to Romania. The embassy provides consular services to Canadian citizens residing or travelling in Romania, Bulgaria, and Moldova.

History 

Canada appointed its first resident ambassador to Romania in 1967.

A new four-storey chancery building was inaugurated in December 2006 and is located at 1-3, Tuberozelor Street in Bucharest. Its striking architecture includes pre-oxidized copper panels on two building faces.

On June 15, 2009, Lawrence Cannon, Canadian Minister of Foreign Affairs, announced the appointment of Philippe Beaulne as Ambassador to Romania, with concurrent accreditation to the Republic of Bulgaria, and High Commissioner to the Republic of Cyprus.

Joanne Lemay became the Ambassador to Romania in August 2013. She was succeeded by Kevin Hamilton, who was appointed as Ambassador in June 2016, with concurrent accreditation to the Republic of Bulgaria and the Republic of Moldova.

Ambassadors

Canada-Romania relations 

Bilateral relations at embassy level were initiated on April 3, 1967.

Romania’s Embassy in Ottawa was opened in 1970. Romania has three consulates general, in Montreal, Toronto, Vancouver, and an honorary consulate in Moncton. Both countries are members of NATO.

Romania's senior official in Ottawa currently is Mr. Bogdan Manoiu, Chargé d'affaires.

See also 
 Canadians of Romanian descent

References

External links 
 Embassy of Canada to Romania
 Canadian Foreign Affairs and International Trade Office about relations with Romania
 Romanian Ministry of Foreign Affairs about relations with Canada

Bucharest
1976 establishments in Romania
Canada–Romania relations
Canada